Charles Parnell (born October 26, 1964) is an American actor. He is best known for being the second actor to portray Police Chief Derek Frye on All My Children, the role of Master Chief Russ Jeter on the TNT show The Last Ship, and the role of Solomon "Warlock" Bates in Top Gun: Maverick.

Parnell took over the role of Frye on All My Children, previously played by actor William Christian. He joined the cast of the show on September 8, 2005, and made his final appearance on September 24, 2007. Parnell also provides the voice of Jefferson Twilight on Cartoon Network's The Venture Bros.

Career
Before taking the role of Derek Frye, Parnell played Achilles in Iphigeneia at Aulis, a play by Euripides translated and adapted by Kenneth Cavander at the Yale Repertory Theater in New Haven, Connecticut.

Filmography

Television

Film

Video games

References

External links
 
 

Living people
African-American male actors
American male film actors
American male television actors
American male voice actors
American male soap opera actors
21st-century American male actors
21st-century African-American people
1964 births